The Osgood Center for International Studies is a not-for-profit educational foundation located at 1629 K Street, NW, Suite 300, Washington, D.C. It is named in honor of Robert E. Osgood and his wife Gretchen.

Robert Osgood served for over twenty-five years on the faculty of the Paul H. Nitze School of Advanced International Studies, a part of Johns Hopkins University. In addition to serving as Dean of SAIS, Osgood served on the United States National Security Council (1969-1970) and as a member of the US Department of State Policy Planning Staff (1983–85).

The Osgood Center specializes in providing structured learning opportunities, experiential study programs, and internships in the Washington, D.C. area for college and university students from around the world. Its regular programs provide individual internships, simulation games for groups of students, January semester classes, and a summer institute on foreign policy.

It has cooperative programs with the [George Washington University Elliott School], Alma College, and the University of Houston Honors College and with St. Benilde University in Manila.

Shelton L. Williams is the President of the Osgood Center. Its board of directors includes the former president of the East-West Center in Honolulu, Charles Morrison, and Sheldon Ray of Raymond James., Vice-President of Lockheed-Martin.

External links
The Osgood Center Website

Non-profit organizations based in Washington, D.C.
Internship programs